Lonnie Marts Jr. (born November 10, 1968) is a former American Football linebacker who played ten seasons in the National Football League (NFL).  He currently resides in Jacksonville, Florida and coaches future NFL hopefuls with his athletic training company Godspeed Sports Performance.

Professional career
Marts began his NFL career as a free agent from Tulane University where he had a position as a safety, despite his large frame. In 1991, he was discovered by Tony Dungy and signed with the Kansas City Chiefs. He later played with the Tampa Bay Buccaneers from 1994 to 1996. Many believe that during this time is when he was at his best performance. He later played with the Tennessee Oilers and started 15 games with the team until 1998. In 1999, Lonnie played with the Jacksonville Jaguars and replaced the injured Bryce Paup. He retired with the Jaguars in 2000.

Current profession
Marts is currently the director and trainer of Godspeed Sports Performance. He is also the athletic director at Harvest Community School in Jacksonville, Florida.

In addition to his role at Godspeed Sports Performance, in his spare time, Marts coaches football to aspiring players in Jacksonville, Florida.

Personal life
He is married to Gionne Taylor Marts, and they have five children.

References

External links
Godspeed Sports Performance Official Site
Lonnie Marts Tampa Bay Buccaneers Football Stats
Lonnie Marts being signed to the Tennessee Oilers

Kansas City Chiefs players
Tampa Bay Buccaneers players
Tennessee Oilers players
Jacksonville Jaguars players
Tulane Green Wave football players
American football linebackers
1968 births
Living people
American exercise instructors
St. Augustine High School (New Orleans) alumni